Fernando José Marques Maciel (born 19 July 1997), commonly known as Fernandinho, is a Brazilian professional footballer who plays as a forward for Mirassol.

Club career
Born in São Luís, Maranhão, Fernandinho finished his formation with Sampaio Corrêa. He made his first team debut on 12 April 2015, coming on as a second-half substitute in a 0–0 Campeonato Maranhense home draw against Moto Club.

Fernandinho never established himself as a starter for the club, rescinded his contract in March 2017 and subsequently moved to Noroeste. After playing in the year's Campeonato Paulista Série A3, he moved on loan to Ponte Preta on 3 May, returning to the under-20 squad.

In September 2017, Fernandinho moved to Internacional on loan. He returned to his parent club the following March, but signed for Bahia on 29 May.

Fernandinho made his Bahia – and Série A – debut on 3 June 2018, replacing Júnior Brumado in a 0–2 home loss against Grêmio. His spell at the club was mainly associated to the under-23 squad, and on 13 December 2019, he was loaned to Joinville for the 2020 season.

On 3 June 2020, Fernandinho was announced at Chapecoense in the Série B, on loan for the remainder of the campaign. Shortly after arriving, he suffered a knee injury which sidelined him until January 2021.

On 17 February 2021, Fernandinho renewed with Chape until the end of the year.

Career statistics

References

External links
 

1997 births
Living people
People from São Luís, Maranhão
Brazilian footballers
Association football forwards
Campeonato Brasileiro Série A players
Campeonato Brasileiro Série B players
Sampaio Corrêa Futebol Clube players
Esporte Clube Noroeste players
Sport Club Internacional players
Esporte Clube Bahia players
Joinville Esporte Clube players
Associação Chapecoense de Futebol players
Sportspeople from Maranhão